Snowslide Lake is an alpine lake in Camas County, Idaho, United States, located in the Smoky Mountains in Sawtooth National Forest. The lake is most easily accessed via trail 070. The lake is located east of Paradise Peak.

References

Lakes of Idaho
Lakes of Camas County, Idaho
Glacial lakes of the United States
Glacial lakes of the Sawtooth National Forest